Joan Roís de Corella (Gandia or Valencia, 1435 – Valencia, 1497) was a Catalan-language writer from the Kingdom of Valencia.

He was born into a minor noble family of Aragonese origin in either Gandia or Valencia and apparently followed a career in the church. He may have been ordained as a priest, but apparently had two children. 

He is believed to have contributed to Tirant lo Blanc. His other works, in prose and verse, included the Tragèdia de Caldesa and the Parlament en casa de Berenguer Mercader. He also produced a translation of the psalter into Valencian.

He died at Valencia in 1497.

External links
  Selected works by Joan Roís de Corella at the Biblioteca Virtual Joan Lluís Vives.

See also
 Route of the Valencian classics

Writers from the Valencian Community
1435 births
1497 deaths
Medieval Catalan-language writers
Renaissance writers
Spanish Renaissance people
Translators to Catalan
Translators of the Bible into Catalan
People from Gandia
People from Valencia
15th-century Spanish writers
15th-century people from the Kingdom of Aragon